Nagy Aguilera De La Rosa (born May 28, 1986) is a Dominican professional boxer. He is perhaps best known for his upset first-round knockout win over former WBC heavyweight champion Oleg Maskaev.

Professional career

2009
Nagy Aguilera knocked out in 2009 the former WBC Heavyweight Champion Oleg Maskaev in the first round on December 11, 2009 in what was considered an upset. Since then, Aguilera has been considered a journeyman of the ring.

2010
He has also previously fought (and lost by Knockout) to former WBC Heavyweight Champion Samuel Peter and former World Light Heavyweight Champion Antonio Tarver.

2011
On May 14, 2011 Aguilera lost by K.O. to Mexican-American Chris Arreola.

2012
In March 2012 he lost to Tomasz Adamek by unanimous decision: 99–91, 100-90 y 100–90.

Professional boxing record

References

External links

1986 births
Living people
Dominican Republic male boxers
Heavyweight boxers
20th-century Dominican Republic people
21st-century Dominican Republic people